Haystack Mountain is a mountain ridge in the Ridge and Valley region of the Appalachian Mountains, located in western Maryland just west of the city of Cumberland.  The mountain forms the southern wall of the Cumberland Narrows.

Geography
Haystack Mountain rises just north of Cresaptown to the southwest of Cumberland and runs in a northeastward direction, achieving a height of  before falling to a  gap through which Interstate 68 passes. Across the Narrows is Wills Mountain. Geologically, the two mountains are equivalent.

History
The original route for the National Road ascended over Haystack Mountain, through the gap which I-68 now traverses,  following an American Indian pathways known as Nemacolin's Path. This path was chosen by General Braddock during the French and Indian war, and was later used as part of the National Road. Remnants of the road can still be viewed today. This road was used by thousands of travelers who struggled to safely climb the mountain with their possessions stowed in creaky wagons. Travelers faced even greater dangers descending Haystack Mountain, due to its steeper grade, near present-day Sunset Drive. The road continued toward today's LaVale Plaza and ascended to the Clarysville Inn, an important wagon stand and stage house between LaVale, Maryland and Frostburg, Maryland.  The National Highway (modern day U.S. Route 40) was later routed around Haystack Mountain through the Cumberland Narrows.

References

External links
The National Road

Landforms of Allegany County, Maryland
Landforms of Garrett County, Maryland
Ridges of Maryland